Giambattista Milani, C.R. (died 1617) was a Roman Catholic prelate who served as Bishop of Bergamo (1592–1611).

Biography
Giambattista Milani was ordained a priest in the Congregation of Clerics Regular of the Divine Providence.
On 8 Apr 1592, he was appointed during the papacy of Pope Clement VIII as Bishop of Bergamo.
He served as Bishop of Bergamo until his resignation in 1611. 
He died on 13 Jun 1617.

References

External links and additional sources
 (for Chronology of Bishops) 
 (for Chronology of Bishops) 

16th-century Roman Catholic bishops in the Republic of Venice
17th-century Roman Catholic bishops in the Republic of Venice
Bishops appointed by Pope Clement VIII
1617 deaths
Theatine bishops
Bishops of Bergamo